George Huntley Badenoch (9 April 1882 – 15 June 1915) was a Scottish professional footballer who played in the Football League for Glossop as an outside forward. He made over 125 appearances for Southern League clubs Watford, Northampton Town and Tottenham Hotspur.

Personal life 
Badenoch was an engineer by trade and served in the Galloway Rifle Volunteers prior to leaving Scotland for England in 1901. His football career ended due to a knee injury. Following a summer in Canada in 1908, Badenoch and his wife emigrated to the country in January 1910 and reunited with other members of the Badenoch family in Indian Head, Saskatchewan. There, he had two children and played for the local cricket club. Badenoch returned to Britain with his family in 1913 and the following year, after the outbreak of the First World War, he enlisted as a private in the 1st (Western Ontario) Battalion of the Canadian Expeditionary Force. At the time of his enlistment, he was working as a sales manager. Badenoch was posted to the Western Front with his regiment in February 1915 and saw action at St. Julien and Kitcheners' Wood. He was killed on 15 June 1915, during the Second Action of Givenchy and is commemorated on the Vimy Memorial.

Career statistics

Honours 
Watford
Southern League Second Division: 1903–04
Northampton Town
 Southern League First Division: 1908–09

References

1882 births
1915 deaths
People from Castle Douglas
Scottish footballers
English Football League players
Association football outside forwards
Heart of Midlothian F.C. players
Canadian military personnel killed in World War I
Canadian Expeditionary Force soldiers
Glossop North End A.F.C. players
Watford F.C. players
Tottenham Hotspur F.C. players
Northampton Town F.C. players
Southern Football League players
Scottish expatriate sportspeople in Canada
Scottish cricketers
Scottish military personnel
Royal Canadian Regiment soldiers

Association football wing halves